Statistics of JSL Cup in the 1990 season.

Overview
It was contested by 28 teams, and Nissan Motors won the championship.

Results

1st round
Toyota Motors 2-0 Kawasaki Steel
NKK 3-0 Toho Titanium
Mazda 2-2 (PK 4–3) Kyoto Shiko
All Nippon Airways 4-0 Nippon Steel
Matsushita Electric 1-2 Fujitsu
Hitachi 1-1 (PK 3–2) Sumitomo Metals
Toshiba 3-0 Tanabe Pharmaceuticals
Furukawa Electric 4-1 Kofu
Yanmar Diesel 1-0 Mitsubishi Motors
NTT Kanto 2-0 Osaka Gas
Honda 2-1 Yomiuri Juniors
Cosmo Oil 2-0 Otsuka Pharmaceutical

2nd round
Nissan Motors 3-0 Toyota Motors
NKK 0-3 Mazda
All Nippon Airways 1-1 (PK 4–2) Fujitsu
Hitachi 0-4 Yomiuri
Yamaha Motors 1-0 Toshiba
Furukawa Electric 1-1 (PK 4–1) Yanmar Diesel
NTT Kanto 0-2 Honda
Cosmo Oil 3-1 Fujita Industries

Quarterfinals
Nissan Motors 1-0 Mazda
All Nippon Airways 1-0 Yomiuri
Yamaha Motors 1-1 (PK 4–5) Furukawa Electric
Honda 1-0 Cosmo Oil

Semifinals
Nissan Motors 1-0 All Nippon Airways
Furukawa Electric 0-0 (PK 4–3) Honda

Final
Nissan Motors 3-1 Furukawa Electric
Nissan Motors won the championship

References
 

JSL Cup
Lea